This is a list of United States Twenty20 International cricketers.

In April 2018, the ICC decided to grant full Twenty20 International (T20I) status to all its members. Therefore, all Twenty20 matches played between USA and other ICC members after 1 January 2019 will have T20I status.

This list comprises all members of the USA cricket team who have played at least one T20I match. It is initially arranged in the order in which each player won his first Twenty20 cap. Where more than one player won his first Twenty20 cap in the same match, those players are listed alphabetically by surname.

Key

List of players
Statistics are correct as of 17 July 2022.

See also
 List of United States ODI cricketers

Notes

References 

United States
Twenty20 International cricketers